Michalis Tzirakis (born 6 March 1954) is a Greek former professional footballer who played as defender.

Club career
Tzirakis took his first football steps in 1968 he joined OFI youth team and in 1971 he became a professional, playing in the outside right position with success. When OFI was promoted to the first division, he played with the first team and from then on he became irreplaceable. However arrival at OFI of the great coach Les Shannon also marked a change for Tzirakis since he established himself in the position of libero where his performance rose a lot and his game was distinguished by dynamism and self-sacrifice. His good performances attracted the interest of PAOK, who in 1979 made an offer to OFI, which the latter rejected. In the summer of 1980 it was AEK's turn to show interest for the player. However, Tzirakis was very much loved by the people of OFI who pushed for him to remain in the Cretan team, while their management tried to find a solution.
In the board of directors, the president of OFI proposed to give 8 million drachmas to Tzirakis and not to give him to any other club for five years. His proposal was voted down and by 8 votes to 6 against, it was decided to transfer Tzirakis to AEK. The president of OFI, Doulofakis raised the issue his of resignation and an administrative crisis broke out. Thus, the persistence of AEK and their owner Loukas Barlos as well as the will of the footballer overcame the obstacles that existed and Tzirakis was transferred to AEK at a total cost of 17 million drachmas, an amount that reached 20% of the club's share capital and even so for a defender. AEK gave 8 million drachmas to OFI and 5.5 million drachmas to the footballer while also paying 3.5 million drachmas to the tax office. Tzirakis was called upon to cover the gap of Lakis Nikolaou in defense and formed with Petros Ravousis the central defensive duo. At the beginning of the season and in the big games he was infallible, while showing a frivolity against theoretically weak opponents. However, the first impressions of the presence were quite positive. With AEK he won the Greek Cup in 1983 in a 2–0 against PAOK, where he came in as a sub, at the 65th minute. In the summer of 1983, he left AEK and after a three-month layoff, he returned to OFI in December 1983, where he played a few league games until the summer of 1985, when he stopped playing football at the age of 31.

Honours

OFI
Beta Etniki: 1975–76

AEK Athens
Greek Cup: 1982–83

References

1954 births
Living people
Super League Greece players
OFI Crete F.C. players
AEK Athens F.C. players
Association football defenders
Footballers from Heraklion
Greek footballers